Thyretes signivenis is a moth in the  family Erebidae. It was described by Hering in 1937. It is found in the Democratic Republic of Congo.

References

Natural History Museum Lepidoptera generic names catalog

Moths described in 1937
Syntomini
Endemic fauna of the Democratic Republic of the Congo